Ashina Duoxifu (Old Turkic: Turs Beg; Title: Eletmiš Yabγu) — was a younger brother of Elteriš Qaγan and Qapγan Qaγan in Turkic Empire.

Life 
He took part in war against Toquz Oγuz with Elteriš between 682 - 687 near Tuul River. Then he was made governor (šad) of eastern wing. He was appointed to this position by Elteriš Qaγan in 687 and was reconfirmed by Qapγan Qaγan in 699. His was mainly active in Ongi steppe (near Ongi river).

Family 
He had several issues:

 Bilgä Išbara Tamγan Tarqan
 Išbara Tamγan Čor
 Pan Kol Tegin
 Uti Beg

Death and legacy 
He was killed by Kol Tegin as a part of coup against Inäl Qaγan in 716. He was succeeded by his son Bilgä Išbara Tamγan Tarqan as he submitted to Bilgä Qaγan. His son ordered Ongi Inscription to be erected in his honour.

References 

716 deaths
8th-century Turkic people
Ashina house of the Turkic Empire